Rashod Berry (born October 14, 1996) is an American football outside linebacker for the Indianapolis Colts of the National Football League (NFL). He played college football for Ohio State.

Early years 
Born in 1996, Berry played basketball and football at Lorain High School.  A wide receiver and defensive end in high school, he went on to play as a tight end for five years at Ohio State (though for his freshmen year he was listed as a defensive end), accumulating 17 receptions for 198 yards and four touchdowns.

Professional career

New England Patriots
Berry was signed by the New England Patriots as an undrafted free agent following the 2020 NFL Draft on May 5, 2020. He was waived during final roster cuts on September 5, 2020, and signed to the team's practice squad the next day. He was elevated to the active roster on October 17 and December 5 for the team's weeks 6 and 13 games against the Denver Broncos and Los Angeles Chargers, and reverted to the practice squad after each game. He made his NFL debut in the Broncos game. He was promoted to the active roster on January 2, 2021.

On August 15, 2021, Berry was waived by the Patriots.

Detroit Lions
On August 18, 2021, Berry signed with the Detroit Lions. He was waived on August 31, 2021 and re-signed to the practice squad the next day, but released the following day. He was re-signed on October 6. He was promoted to the active roster on December 4. 

On March 10, 2022, Berry re-signed with the Lions. He was waived on May 10.

Jacksonville Jaguars
On May 11, 2022, Berry was claimed by the Jacksonville Jaguars. He was waived on August 30, 2022. He was re-signed to the practice squad on October 12.

Indianapolis Colts
On January 4, 2023, Berry was signed by the Indianapolis Colts off the Jaguars practice squad.

References

External links
 New England Patriots bio

1996 births
Living people
Sportspeople from Lorain, Ohio
Players of American football from Ohio
American football tight ends
American football defensive ends
American football outside linebackers
Detroit Lions players
Ohio State Buckeyes football players
New England Patriots players
Jacksonville Jaguars players
Indianapolis Colts players